Segona Divisió 2008–09 was the 10th season of football of Segona Divisió, in Andorra.

Regular Stage

League table

Round 1
[Sep 20]
Jenlai          3–5 Atlètic
[Sep 21]
Lusitans B      4–1 Principat B
Encamp          0–0 Benfica
Extremenya      bye

Round 2
[Sep 27]
Extremenya      4–0 Jenlai
[Sep 28]
Benfica         2–3 Lusitans B
[Sep 29]
Atlètic         awd Principat B       [awarded 3–0, originally 3–4]
Encamp          bye

Round 3
[Oct 4]
Jenlai          2–5 Benfica
[Oct 5]
Extremenya      1–3 Encamp
[Oct 6]
Lusitans B      1–2 Atlètic
Principat B     bye

Round 4
[Oct 11]
Encamp          5–0 Jenlai
[Oct 12]
Benfica         0–5 Atlètic
Principat B     1–1 Extremenya
Lusitans B      bye

Round 5
[Oct 19]
Extremenya      1–6 Lusitans B
Atlètic         3–4 Encamp
[Oct 20] 
Jenlai          1–3 Principat B
Benfica         bye

Round 6
[Oct 25]
Extremenya      3–0 Benfica    
Encamp          3–0 Principat B    
[Oct 26]
Lusitans B      0–0 Jenlai        
Atlètic         bye

Round 7
[Nov 8]
Atlètic         1–1 Extremenya        
[Nov 9]
Encamp          2–1 Lusitans B      
Principat B     3–0 Benfica           
Jenlai          bye

Round 8
[Nov 22]
Benfica         2–2 Encamp           
[Nov 23]
Atlètic         6–3 Jenlai           
[Nov 24]
Principat B     0–2 Lusitans B       
Extremenya      bye

Round 9
[Dec 13]
Principat B     0–3 Atlètic          
[Mar 21]
Lusitans B      4–3 Benfica      
Jenlai         1–10 Extremenya       
Encamp          bye

Round 10
[Jan 25]
Encamp          3–1 Extremenya       
Atlètic         3–1 Lusitans B  
[Feb 8]
Benfica         7–0 Jenlai        
Principat B     bye

Round 11
[Feb 21]
Atlètic         0–5 Benfica          
Jenlai         1–11 Encamp            
[Feb 22]
Extremenya      4–1 Principat B      
Lusitans B      bye

Round 12
[Feb 28]
Lusitans B      4–2 Extremenya        
[Mar 1] 
Encamp          1–1 Atlètic      
Principat B     n/p Jenlai               
Benfica         bye

Round 13
[Mar 7]
Jenlai          0–7 Lusitans B          
[Mar 8]     
Principat B     2–8 Encamp   
Benfica         1–1 Extremenya       
Atlètic         bye

Round 14
[Mar 15]    
Lusitans B      2–2 Encamp  
Benfica         5–0 Principat B  
[Mar 16]       
Extremenya      2–1 Atlètic            
Jenlai          bye

Promotion Playoff

Final table

Round 1
[Mar 28]
Atlètic         3–2 Encamp
[Mar 29]
Lusitans B      2–2 Extremenya

Round 2 [Apr 5]
Encamp          1–3 Extremenya
Atlètic         0–1 Lusitans B

Round 3 [Apr 19]
Encamp          2–0 Lusitans B
Extremenya      0–0 Atlètic

Round 4
[Apr 25]
Extremenya      1–1 Lusitans B      
[Apr 26]
Encamp          0–1 Atlètic

Round 17 [May 3]
Lusitans B      0–1 Atlètic         
Extremenya      1–2 Encamp

Round 18 [May 10]
Lusitans B      1–2 Encamp          
Atlètic         2–2 Extremenya

Promotion and relegation playoff

Inter Club d'Escaldes competed in a two-legged relegation play-off against Atlètic Club d'Escaldes, runners-up from Segona Divisió, for one spot in 2009–10 Primera Divisió. Inter successfully retained their Primera Divisió spot after winning on penalties 10–9.

Segona Divisió seasons
Andorra
2008–09 in Andorran football